The "Aviators March" also known as the "March of the Pilots" is a Soviet military march published in the spring of 1923 that currently serves as the organizational anthem of the Russian Aerospace Forces. It formerly served as the organizational anthem of the Soviet Air Force. A German version with the same melody called "Das Berliner Jungarbeiterlied" was used up until the end of the Second World War. It is part of the repertoire of Russian military bands and today is frequently performed at Victory Day Parades in Moscow and throughout the former Soviet Union. The melody to the march was used during World War II in Yugoslav Macedonia in a song titled "In the struggle, the Macedonian people!".

The melody was borrowed by German Communists in early 1920s and used with German lyrics. Later, German Nazis in turn borrowed the melody, changed only a couple of chords and wrote their own lyrics to the song. The new march under the title "Herbei zum Kampf" also known under the title "Das Berliner Jungarbeiterlied"  was used by the SA since 1929.

In the pro-Soviet East Germany, the march was used since the late 1950s with the original Soviet music (not the Nazi version) and new German lyrics dedicated to the Soviet (not East German) Air Force.

Lyrics

See also

Hymn of the Bolshevik Party
Royal Air Force March Past
"The U.S. Air Force"

References

External links
Авиамарш (Марш Авиаторов) – La Banda Militare: Italian and International Military Music

1923 songs
Russian Air Force
Air force music
Soviet songs
Russian military songs
Russian military marches